This is a list of 429 species in the genus Anthophora.

Anthophora species

References